Haplogroup A-P305 also known as A1 is a human Y-chromosome DNA haplogroup. Like its parent haplogroup haplogroup A0-T (A-L1085), A1 includes the vast majority of living human males. It emerged in Africa approximately 161,300 years ago.  By comparison, members of its sole sibling subclade, haplogroup A0 – the only other primary subclade of haplogroup A0-T – are found mostly in Africa.

Basal, undivergent A-P305* is largely restricted to populations native to Africa, though a handful of cases have been reported in Europe and Western Asia. A-P305* is found at its highest rates in Bakola Pygmies (South Cameroon) at 8.3% and Berbers from Tunisia at 1.5% and in Ghana. The clade also achieves high frequencies in the Bushmen hunter-gatherer populations of Southern Africa, followed closely by many Nilotic groups in Eastern Africa. However, haplogroup A's oldest sub-clades are exclusively found in Central-Northwest Africa, where it, and consequently Y-chromosomal Adam, is believed to have originated about 140,000 years ago. The clade has also been observed at notable frequencies in certain populations in Ethiopia, as well as some Pygmy groups in Central Africa.

Footnotes

A1